Tonragee is a village situated on the Currane peninsula in the parish of Achill. It has its own national school, a pub called the Way Inn, and it also has a pipe band, the Tonragee Pipeband.

Towns and villages in County Mayo